The Women's 30 kilometre classical competition at the FIS Nordic World Ski Championships 2021 was held on 6 March 2021.

Results
The race was started at 12:30.

References

Women's 30 kilometre classical